Goodenia debilis is a species of flowering plant in the family Goodeniaceae and is endemic to Queensland. It is an annual herb with linear to lance-shaped leaves at the base of the plant, and leafy racemes of cream-coloured or yellow flowers with brownish markings.

Description

Taxonomy and naming
Goodenia debilis was first formally described in 2002 by Ailsa E. Holland and T.P. Boyle in the journal  Austrobaileya from specimens collected in Bulleringa National Park. The specific epithet (debilis) means "feeble" or "weak".

Distribution and habitat
This goodenia grows in woodland with species of Eucalyptus and Melaleuca in Queensland between the Torres Strait Islands and Townsville with a single collection on Mornington Island.

References

debilis
Flora of Queensland
Plants described in 2002